Saint-Jean-de-Muzols (Vivaro-Alpine: Sant Joan de Mosol) is a commune in the Ardèche department in southern France.

Population

See also
 Pont Grand
 Communes of the Ardèche department

References

Communes of Ardèche
Ardèche communes articles needing translation from French Wikipedia